Tamale Girls' Senior High School is a public senior high school for girls located in Tamale in the Northern Region of Ghana.

History 
Tamale Girls Senior High School was founded in the 1998/99 academic year as Northern Region's first girls senior high school. The school was founded on the idea of RAINS/CAMFED, an international NGO, in partnership with the Regional Co-ordinating Council (RCC) and the Ghana Education Service to meet the region's critical requirements for female institutions.

The school began with a student body of 62 females and 12 teachers. General Arts, General Science, Business, and Home Economics are the study programs. With the school's growth, the enrolment now stands at 1,328 students, with 73 teachers and 59 non-teaching staff members.

Mr. Issah Issahaku was the school's first acting Head of School in 1999. (INSECT). An interim management board backed him up.

Miss Mercy Amanquandoh was appointed as the school's first formal headmistress in the year 2000. Hajia Mariatu Mohammed, the second headmistress, handed up the leadership of the school in January 2010 after she retired. She, too, retired in May 2014, and the school's management was taken over by Hajia Amina M. Musah, the school's third Headmistress. In October 2016, Hajia Nafisa Abukari, the 4th Headmistress, was transferred from Sawla SHS to Tamale Girls SHS as the new headmistress.

References 

Girls' schools in Ghana
High schools in Ghana
Schools in Northern Region (Ghana)
Tamale, Ghana
Educational institutions established in 1988
1988 establishments in Ghana